Walter Reginald Brook Oliver (7 September 1883 – 16 May 1957) was a New Zealand naturalist, ornithologist, malacologist, and museum curator.

Biography
Born in Launceston, Tasmania, Oliver emigrated with his family to New Zealand in 1896, settling in Tauranga. Having already developed an interest in nature during his childhood, he systematically recorded natural observations throughout much of his life, joining other naturalists on an expedition to the Kermadec Islands in 1908.

In 1910, Oliver became a member of the Royal Australasian Ornithologists Union (RAOU) for which body he served as branch secretary for New Zealand from 1914 to his death in 1957, a period of office of 43 years. During this period, he also served as RAOU vice-president from 1942 to 1943, and as president from 1943 to 1944.

Oliver was appointed director of the Dominion Museum in 1928, and in 1930, he published the seminal guide New Zealand Birds, which was updated and expanded in 1955. The guide contained many colour plates by Lily Attey Daff, although she was not credited with the work. Oliver retired from the position of director in 1946.  Oliver was active in numerous scientific societies, and was a prolific contributor to New Zealand scientific literature over his career. He was government representative on the Council of the Royal Society of New Zealand for many years, its president from 1952 to 1954, and editor of its Transactions from 1948 to 1954.

Oliver described several species new to science, including:
 Snares penguin
 Calliostoma waikanae, a sea snail
 Shepherd's beaked whale

A species of New Zealand lizard, Oligosoma oliveri, is named in his honour.

In 1935, Oliver was awarded the King George V Silver Jubilee Medal.

References

Further reading
 
 Dell RK (1998). "Oliver, Walter Reginald Brook 1883-1957". Dictionary of New Zealand Biography 4: 389–390. HTM.

External links
 WRB Oliver from Encyclopedia of New Zealand (1966)
 some (not all) articles by Walter Oliver in Transactions and Proceedings of the Royal Society of New Zealand

1883 births
1957 deaths
New Zealand curators
New Zealand malacologists
New Zealand naturalists
New Zealand ornithologists
People from Tauranga
Victoria University of Wellington alumni
People from Launceston, Tasmania
Presidents of the Royal Society of New Zealand
Australian emigrants to New Zealand
New Zealand paleontologists
20th-century New Zealand zoologists